Changzhi Stadium is a multi-purpose stadium in Changzhi, China.  It is currently used mostly for football matches.  The stadium holds 27,000 spectators.

References

Football venues in China
Multi-purpose stadiums in China
Sports venues in Shanxi